In statistics, Cochran's theorem, devised by William G. Cochran, is a theorem used to justify results relating to the probability distributions of statistics that are used in the analysis of variance.

Statement 
Let be symmetric matrices. Define , so that the Qi are quadratic forms. Further assume . 

Cochran's theorem states that the following are equivalent: 

 ,
 the Qi are independent
 each Qi has a chi-squared distribution with ri degrees of freedom.

But after an orthogonal transform, and so we reduce to the above theorem.

Proof 

It comes out to be 

(To calculate it, first diagonalize , change into that frame, then use the fact that the characteristic function of the sum of independent variables is the product of their characteristic functions.)

Claim: .

Proof: .

Lemma: If , all  symmetric, and have eigenvalues 0, 1, then they are simultaneously diagonalizable.

Fix i, and consider the eigenvectors v of  such that . Then we have , so all . Now induct by moving into .

Case: All  are independent

Then consider . It is diagonalized as well.

Let , then it is also standard Gaussian. Then we have 

Inspect their diagonal entries, to see that  implies that their nonzero diagonal entries are disjoint.

Case: Each  is a  distribution.

Fix any , diagonalize it by orthogonal transform , and reindex, so that .

Since , we get all . So all , and have eigenvalues .

So diagonalize them simultaneously, add them up, to find .

Case: 
We first show that the matrices B(i) can be simultaneously diagonalized by an orthogonal matrix and that their non-zero eigenvalues are all equal to +1. Once that's shown, take this orthogonal transform to this simultaneous eigenbasis, in which the random vector  becomes , but all  are still independent and standard Gaussian. Then the result follows.

Each of the matrices B(i) has rank ri and thus ri non-zero eigenvalues. For each i, the sum  has at most rank . Since , it follows that C(i) has exactly rank N − ri.

Therefore B(i) and C(i) can be simultaneously diagonalized. This can be shown by first diagonalizing B(i), by the spectral theorem. In this basis, it is of the form:

Thus the lower  rows are zero. Since , it follows that these rows in C(i) in this basis contain a right block which is a  unit matrix, with zeros in the rest of these rows. But since C(i) has rank N − ri, it must be zero elsewhere. Thus it is diagonal in this basis as well. It follows that all the non-zero eigenvalues of both B(i) and C(i) are +1. This argument applies for all i, thus all B(i) are positive semidefinite.

By iteration it follows that all B-s are simultaneously diagonalizable.

Examples

Sample mean and sample variance 
If X1, ..., Xn are independent normally distributed random variables with mean μ and standard deviation σ then

is standard normal for each i. Note that the total Q is equal to sum of squared Us as shown here:

which stems from the original assumption that .
So instead we will calculate this quantity and later separate it into Qi's. It is possible to write

(here  is the sample mean).

and expand to give

The third term is zero because it is equal to a constant times

and the second term has just n identical terms added together. Thus

and hence

Now  with  the matrix of ones which has rank 1. In turn      given that . This expression can be also obtained by expanding  in matrix notation. Thus the conditions for Cochran's theorem are met.

Cochran's theorem then states that Q1 and Q2 are independent, with chi-squared distributions with n − 1 and 1 degree of freedom respectively. This shows that the sample mean and sample variance are independent.  This can also be shown by Basu's theorem, and in fact this property characterizes the normal distribution – for no other distribution are the sample mean and sample variance independent.

Distributions

The result for the distributions is written symbolically as

Both these random variables are proportional to the true but unknown variance σ2. Thus their ratio does not depend on σ2 and, because they are statistically independent. The distribution of their ratio is given by

where F1,n − 1 is the F-distribution with 1 and n − 1 degrees of freedom (see also Student's t-distribution). The final step here is effectively the definition of a random variable having the F-distribution.

Estimation of variance 
To estimate the variance σ2, one estimator that is sometimes used is the maximum likelihood estimator of the variance of a normal distribution

Cochran's theorem shows that

and the properties of the chi-squared distribution show that

Alternative formulation
The following version is often seen when considering linear regression. Then, on defining , any one of the following conditions implies the other two:

 

See also 
 Cramér's theorem, on decomposing normal distribution
 Infinite divisibility (probability)

References

Theorems in statistics
Characterization of probability distributions